The Mount Pleasant Football Club is an Australian Rules Football club which competes in the HDFL.

The club is based in Toolleen, Victoria and has participated in the HDFL since 1935.

The Mighty Mounts have appeared in 28 grand finals, winning nineteen, the most recent in 2006.

Location

History

Local players first played under the name of Mount Pleasant Football Club in 1889. Prior to this, players from around the Runnymede district, including Creek View, played under the name Runnymede and for many years they played in the paddocks of local farming families. It was not until 1952 that the club’s headquarters became the Toolleen Recreation Reserve. 

The club’s name comes from the Mount Pleasant Creek, a eminently close to the original farming paddocks played on, and an old map indicates a Mount Pleasant existed at Creek View. MPFC was made up of families who settled in the Runnymede district, mainly from Ireland and England, families who still to this day have a large influence and presence in the club. In their time they have seen many clubs come and go including Runnymede, Avonmore, Muskerry, Fosterville, Goornong, Axedale, Knowsley, Toolleen, and Crosbie, in which MPFC has welcomed players and supporters from each and everyone one of them into their fold.

Success (1962 – 2006)
Mount Pleasant is the oldest and most successful team in the HDFNL and has been for a long time now, winning 19 premierships and crowned runners-up seven times. It has had a massive amount of success in the HDFNL and has always been a consistent team, winning flags back to back on more than one occasion and also being runners-up back to back on more than one occasion as well. However, their success has died down in the recent era, having not won a flag or been runner-up in over ten years which is the biggest drought of success in the club's history. The club has the biggest success story in the HDFL and has a lot of talent coming through the senior team, as well as having a lot of time to find their feet because a lot of teams won't be able to grasp their kind of success. Especially for a town as small as Toolleen.

The Future (2010 – present)
Since 2006 Mount Pleasant haven't played in a Grand Final, and have only featured in the finals three times. Despite this, they have a very talented senior team and are always a tough team to play home or away. They have got a lot of history behind them which not all teams have in the HDFNL.

Rivalries
Because of the relatively small sized league rivalries are few and far between in the Heathcote District Football League. Mount Pleasant's rivals are Heathcote, Colbinabbin, and Elmore. Two of the clubs come from within the same region, Shire of Campaspe.

Honours
HDFL

Premierships & Grand Finals

Books
 History of Football in the Bendigo District – John Stoward – 

 Mt Pleasant Football & Netball Club History Book 1889 - 2000

References

Australian rules football clubs in Victoria (Australia)
1889 establishments in Australia
Sports clubs established in 1889